Good Hunting is a 1938 play written by Nathanael West, in collaboration with Joseph Schrank. The play, a satire about World War I, opened in New York City on November 21, 1938, and ran for two performances.

Process of writing
West met Schrank in 1936 and suggested that they collaborate on a play. They discussed ideas for the play over several weeks, after which Schrank dictated a 40-page outline to a secretary. West used the outline to write a first draft, which he completed in May 1937. Schrank revised West's draft during the summer, and West produced a third version by October. In February 1938, Jerome Mayer, a Broadway producer, agreed to stage the play, then titled Gentlemen, the War!; over the summer West and Schrank made further revisions, finally retitling the play Good Hunting.

References

The final version of Good Hunting appears in the Library of America edition of West's writing:
 West, Nathanael. Novels & Other Writings. Ed. Sacvan Bercovitch. New York: The Library of America, 1997. 467–620.

Broadway plays
1938 plays
Plays by Nathanael West